Chandrakiran Sonrexa (October 19, 1920 - May 18, 2009) (Saunareksā, Candrakiraṇa) was a writer of Hindi literature. Her writings in Hindi, spanning a period of 75 years have been published and translated in several languages including Russian, Hungarian, Czechoslovakian and English and also several Indian languages. She worked as a Script writer and Editor at All India Radio, Lucknow for over two decades (1957-1979). In 2001 she was awarded the title of Best Woman Hindi Short Story Writer of the 20th century by Hindi Academy (Delhi) and was presented the award by Sheila Dikshit, Chief Minister of Delhi.

Biography

Early life 
Chandrakiran's father was a storekeeper in the military which was a transferable job. He was posted at Naushera in Peshawar (now in Pakistan) in 1920 where Chandrakiran, his last child, was born. The date or “Tithi” according to the Hindu calendar was Saptami of Durga Navratri in the month of 'Aashwin' (October). By the time she was one and a half year old her father was transferred to Meerut in U.P. (United Province then and Uttar Pradesh now). At first the family rented a house in Rajman Bazar. But in 1923 shifted to Sadar Kabaadi Bazar which was a timber market. Their house was near Bholanath Temple.

Education 
Chandrakiran's first school was Sadar Kanya Pathshala where she was admitted in class one in July 1926. She studied up to class 4th in this school and received a double promotion twice. Thus she cleared four classes in two years. For class 5th she joined Sadar mission school, which was run by Christian missionaries.

She was a very bright student who though always the youngest in class, was exceptionally good at all subjects especially Mathematics, Hindi, Geography. The only subject she could not cope with was drawing. A favorite of all the teachers, Chandrakiran often had to face the jealousy and bullying of her older classmates.

Influence of the Indian freedom movement 
In the year 1931, when Mahatma Gandhi's non-cooperation movement was spreading all over the country she too started to wear Khadi (hand-spun cotton cloth). At the tender age of eleven she longed to participate in the sit-ins to protest at shops selling foreign liquor or clothes, and wanted to join the congress party. She was ready to court arrest even; of course she was not allowed to do any of these by her loving father, who doted on her.

Exposure to literature 
A voracious reader, Chandrakiran devoured any printed matter she could lay her hands on - Hindi/Urdu stories, novels, poems, magazines - besides her text books. She finished 'Ramcharit Manas', Kabir's 'Sakhi-Sabad Ramaini' and 'Sukh-Sagar' even though she could not fully understand them. She read 'Uncle Tom's Cabin' in translation in a serialized form in an Urdu magazine. She finished entire works of renowned Hindi writers like Premchand, Kaushik and Sudarshan. Magazines like 'Madhuri, Saraswati Chand' etc., were borrowed from the neighbors. Even books which her elder sister prohibited her from reading – 'Devdas' of Sharat Chandra Chattopadhyay or 'Hatimtaai' - were read on the sly. Because of the speed with which she finished reading entire volumes, and was a chatter box as well, her brother Kanhaiya Lal called her 'Peshawar Mail'.

First published work 
She wrote her first story titled 'Achhoot' (the untouchable) about the tough life of a village boy of low-caste (who later became an officer, having been educated and converted to Christianity by a priest), at the age of 11 only. It was sent for publication in the magazine 'Vijay' from Calcutta with a note to the editor to print it if found worthy otherwise to be thrown in the trash bin, but not to be sent back. It was signed by her without any address of the writer. But perhaps the editor found the city's name from the stamp of the envelope, hence it carried her name as 'Kumari Chandrakiran', Meerut. Her family and neighbors guessed that it was she, since her name was a rare one. She had expected a reprimand but received praise instead. And her writing career started.

Parents' demise 
She was admitted in Class 8th in Raghunath Girl's High School by her father, despite her eldest brother's opposition. But fate willed otherwise. Her mother, who was a diabetic, fell seriously ill. Since there was no other female in the house to carry the household chores or look offer her mother, her studies came to an abrupt end. On October 10, 1933, when Chandrakiran was 9 days short of her 13th birthday, her mother left this world. Post her demise, she confined herself to the four walls of her home, pursuing whatever studies she could, while running the household. In April 1936 she lost her father too.

Published works

Novels

Collection of short stories

Children drama/stories (2008)

Other

International publications 
In 1962, sponsored by Academician E.P. Chelishave, a collection of best stories was published in Russian language as "Den' Rozhdenniia" the title story being "Birthday".
Story on Family Planning "Grihasthi Ka Sukh" written in the fifties was selected among 10 best stories of Asia and Africa by the government of Czechoslovakia and published in collection named "Rodini Stati". It was translated by Professor Odolen Smekel (Later Czech Ambassador to India). 
Collection of 19 Hindi stories has been translated into English at the University of Oxford under the guidance of head of the department at the Faculty of Oriental Studies (Dr Imre Bangha). 
Stories have been in the prescribed text at the University of London, University of Oxford in the UK and University of California at Berkeley.

Publications in Indian magazines and Indian languages 
Her poems have been published in Kadambini, Naya Gyanodaya etc.

A very large number of stories have been translated in several Indian languages like Bengali magazines Basumati, Prabasi, and Mahila Mangal, Punjabi magazines Preetalahiri, Tamil magazine Kalki, Urdu magazines Saqi and Ajkal.

Research projects 
Doctorates awarded for research projects on her works.

Film made for TV 
Gumrah, a Telefilm on Doordarshan on the topic of terrorism in Punjab

Honors and awards

References

External links 
 Library of Congress
 The Fine Art Archive
 BnF
 Trove
 Rajasthan Education Society
 A presentation on Chandrakiran Sonrexa
 Hindi Samay

1920 births
2009 deaths
Indian writers